Olmai-ye Olya (also Romanized as Olmāī-ye ‘Olyā; also known as Owlmā-ye Bālā and Ūlmā-ye ‘Olyā) is a village in Arshaq-e Shomali Rural District, Arshaq District, Meshgin Shahr County, Ardabil Province, Iran. At the 2006 census, its population was 169, in 36 families.

References 

Towns and villages in Meshgin Shahr County